Homeland is a drama/thriller series developed for American television by Howard Gordon and Alex Gansa and based on the Israeli series Hatufim (English title: Prisoners of War) created by Gideon Raff. The series stars Claire Danes as Carrie Mathison, a Central Intelligence Agency officer and Damian Lewis as Nicholas Brody, a U.S. Marine. Mathison has come to believe that Brody, who was held captive by Al-Qaeda as a prisoner of war, was turned by the enemy and now threatens the United States.

The series is broadcast in the United States on the cable channel Showtime, and is produced by Fox 21. It premiered on October 2, 2011. The first episode was made available online, more than two weeks before broadcast, with viewers having to complete some tasks to unlock access. The series has received critical acclaim, as well as several industry awards, including winning the 2012 Primetime Emmy Award for Outstanding Drama Series, the Golden Globe Award for Best Television Series – Drama, and the Primetime Emmy Award for Outstanding Lead Actor in a Drama Series and Lead Actress in a Drama Series for Damian Lewis and Claire Danes, respectively. Showtime renewed the series for a second season of twelve episodes, which premiered on September 30, 2012.

Total nominations and awards for the cast

Primetime Emmy Awards

Creative Arts Primetime Emmy Awards

Golden Globe Awards

Critics' Choice Awards

Screen Actors Guild Awards

TCA Awards

Satellite Awards

Writers Guild of America Awards

Other awards

References

External links 
 

Awards
Lists of awards by television series